The Experimental Prototype Community of Tomorrow, shortened to EPCOT or E.P.C.O.T.,  is an unfinished concept for a planned community, intended to sit on a massive swath of undeveloped land near Orlando, Florida, that was developed by Walt Disney in collaboration with the designers at Walt Disney Imagineering in the 1960s. Based on ideas stemming from modernism and futurism, and inspired by architectural literature about city planning, Disney intended EPCOT to be a utopian autocratic company town. One of the primary stated aims of EPCOT was to replace urban sprawl as the organizing force of community planning in the United States in the 1960s. Disney intended EPCOT to be a real city, and it was planned to feature commercial, residential, industrial and recreational centers, connected by a mass multimodal transportation system, that would, he said, "Never cease to be a living blueprint of the future." 

After Disney's death in 1966, the plans for EPCOT were eventually abandoned. Later, upon the opening of Walt Disney World in 1971, EPCOT served as the inspiration and namesake for the resort's eponymous theme park, and the nearby planned community of Celebration, Florida. Several components and aesthetic designs of the original EPCOT vision survived and evolved into elements of the modern-day Disney World park, including the Walt Disney World Monorail System and the Disney utilidor system.

History
EPCOT will take its cue from the new ideas and new technologies that are now emerging from the creative centers of American industry. It will be a community of tomorrow that will never be completed, but will always be introducing and testing and demonstrating new materials and systems. And EPCOT will always be a showcase to the world for the ingenuity and imagination of American free enterprise. — Walt Disney, describing the genesis of EPCOTForerunners of Disney's EPCOT plan include Tomorrowland in Disneyland, which already featured monorails and PeopleMovers, and the House of the Future (1957), which was designed by architects from the Massachusetts Institute of Technology. Architect/planner Victor Gruen's plans to convert the site of the 1964 New York World's Fair was also a significant influence on EPCOT, Disney Imagineer Marty Sklar said. Concerned with the "urban crisis" of the time, which he believed was one of the biggest problems facing society, Disney also consulted urban planning literature, including books by Ebenezer Howard, founder of the architectural "garden movement," and Victor Gruen.

Location 
Numerous locations were proposed for EPCOT, including St. Louis, Niagara Falls, Washington D.C., New Jersey, and New York City's World Fair site. Walt also considered incorporating an experimental city into his plans for a Palm Beach, Florida development with RCA and investor John D. MacArthur in 1959. Eventually, Central Florida was chosen. Commenting on the choice, Walt said, "Here in Florida we've enjoyed something that we've never enjoyed at Disneyland: a blessing of size. There's enough land here to hold all the ideas and plans we could possibly imagine." The plans for "The Florida Project," officially dubbed Disney World, called for a Disneyland-style theme park and resort area, E.P.C.O.T., an industrial park, an airport, and an entrance complex.

Disney quietly purchased undeveloped wetlands in Osceola County and Orange County using dummy corporations to avoid price gouging. By June 1965, Disney had acquired 27,433 acres—twice the size of Manhattan—for an estimated $5.1 million ($ in ). Walt Disney had planned to announce Disney World on November 15, 1965 publicly. Still, after the Orlando Sentinel broke the story of Disney's land purchase, Disney asked then-Florida Governor Haydon Burns to confirm the story on October 25. His announcement boasted that the new theme park would be, "The greatest attraction in the history of Florida." The official announcement was made on the previously planned November 15 date, with Disney joining Burns in Orlando for the press conference. Dissatisfied with the zoning regulations he had to deal with in Anaheim, Disney developed the Reedy Creek Improvement District (RCID) for the property. With the approval of the Florida legislature and the governor, as enshrined in the Reedy Creek Improvement Act, the District had most of the powers of a Florida county.

The EPCOT film 
In an effort to lobby the Florida legislature to approve the RCID and persuade American industries to participate in the project, a short film was shot at the Walt Disney Studios on October 27, 1966, two months before Disney's death. Written by Marty Sklar and directed by Ham Luske, the 25-minute film is hosted by Disney, who explains the plans for Disney World, focusing on how EPCOT would interrelate with other aspects of the property. The film, utilizing concept art and highly technical animation, was a start to the conceptualization of EPCOT. The EPCOT philosophy, as it became known, included showcasing the development, testing, and use of new materials and ideas from American industries to find solutions to urban problems. EPCOT would always be in a state of becoming, the philosophy detailed, focusing on the needs and happiness of residents, and generating demand for new technologies. The film was screened for Florida legislators on February 2, 1967. On May 18, 2004, the film, entitled Walt Disney Treasures: Tomorrow Land, was released.

Master plan and community site

Disney personally sketched a master plan for the Florida property known as the Seventh Preliminary Master Plot Plan, in 1966, the year of his death. The main features of the plan include the Magic Kingdom, hotels, camps and motels, convention facilities, EPCOT and a satellite community, a golf course, a "swamp ride," an industrial park, a tourist trailer camp, a main entrance, and a "jet airport." In addition, a monorail runs the length of the property.

Visitors would enter at the southern end of the property and be shuttled by monorail to the Disney World Welcome Center.  There, they would be welcomed by "cast members" able to speak the guests' own languages.  Visitors would re-board the monorail to arrive at the industrial park.  There, guests would ride PeopleMovers to see warehouses and research and development laboratories from American industry. Walt hoped visitors could take ideas back home to improve their own communities.   After visiting the industrial park, the monorail would take the guests to EPCOT, where they would arrive under the central city.

The community
The EPCOT city, according to the concepts presented in the EPCOT film, was based on a radial plan, a design inspired by the garden city movement of urban planning. Based on a concept similar to the layout of Disneyland Park, the city radiates out like a wheel from a central core. The urban density of the area would dwindle as the city fanned out.

The dome

In an article by famed architectural historian Ada Louise Huxtable, "Out of a Fair, A City," which appeared in Horizon magazine in May 1960, Huxtable discusses architect Gruen's vision for a plastic dome over an international bazaar in the central city. There has been much speculation about a dome for EPCOT over the years. Gruen's plan may have been an influence.

An official of the Reedy Creek Improvement District recalled that a dome would pose fire safety issues.  None of the Imagineering artwork shows the international shopping center open to a dome.  However, the Florida Film does include a dome "enclosure." Walt Disney died in December 1966, while much of the EPCOT source material was produced in 1967.  It is difficult to separate what Walt outlined and what was actually published in 1967.  Architect Jon Jerde stated that a glass dome over 50 acres would have been "daunting" due to its cost. Walt Disney was known for striving for the impossible, which may explain the plan for a dome.

Walt Disney talked about the Houston Astrodome and a New York Times article mentioned a dome. The dome was likely another element Walt was wrestling with before his death.

Transportation

The city would be connected to the other points in Disney World with a main line of transportation—the monorail. Walt Disney introduced the Disneyland Monorail in 1959. The monorail would cut through the center of the city, connecting EPCOT with the northern and southern points on the Disney World property.

Internal transportation would be provided by a new Disney transportation concept, the WEDway PeopleMover. The system uses motors located between the tracks to propel vehicles along a pair of steel rails. PeopleMover cars would transport residents from the metropolitan center to the outer residential areas. The PeopleMover concept was first demonstrated at Disneyland's Tomorrowland in 1967. The PeopleMover was also installed at the Magic Kingdom as the WEDWay PeopleMover in 1975.

Because of these two modes of transportation, residents of EPCOT would not need cars. If a resident owned a car, it would be used "only for weekend pleasure trips." The streets for cars would be kept separate from the main pedestrian areas. The main roads for both cars and supply trucks would travel underneath the city core, eliminating the risk of pedestrian accidents. This was also based on the concept that Walt Disney devised for Disneyland. He did not want his guests to see behind-the-scenes activity, such as supply trucks delivering goods to the city. Like the Magic Kingdom in Walt Disney World, all supplies are discreetly delivered via tunnels.

The two systems, the monorail and PeopleMover, would come together at the EPCOT Transportation Lobby. The Transportation Lobby would be located at ground level, above the busy automobile/truck roads. From the Lobby, a passenger riding the monorail from the Magic Kingdom Park to their home would disembark the monorail and transfer to the appropriate PeopleMover station.

Beyond EPCOT, visitors would arrive at the Airport of Tomorrow, located across from the Main Entrance to EPCOT. The airport would have been connected to the park by a monorail station.

The planned airport would have had a general aviation area with an executive terminal, and another for regional passenger travel with a large terminal building. Plans identified the airport in 1966 but was not present in the revised plans in the later 1970s.

City center
EPCOT's downtown and commercial areas would have been located in the central core of the city, away from the residential areas. The entire downtown would have been completely enclosed, unaffected by the outside elements. Roy Disney stated that "The pedestrian will be king" in this area, free from the danger of cars and other vehicles.

At the center of the area would be a 30-story Cosmopolitan Hotel and Convention Center. This building was to have been the tallest building in Disney World and could have been seen for miles. The parking lot for hotel guests would have been located underneath the city core, right off of the vehicle throughway.

On the "roof" of the enclosed area would be the recreational area for hotel guests. The pool, tennis courts, basketball courts, shuffleboard, and other activities would have been located here. According to Imagineer Bob Gurr, Walt Disney pointed to one of the benches on the scale model of the area and declared, "This is where Lilly [his wife] and I will sit when this thing is finished, taking everything in."

Surrounding the hotel, inside the enclosure, would have been "shops and restaurants that reflect the culture and flavor of locations 'round the world." According to the concept art, these areas would be themed to each country, having the look and feel of each of the exotic locales. This concept eventually evolved into the World Showcase area of the Epcot theme park. The PeopleMover track would travel above these downtown shops and streets in a similar fashion as the system did in Disneyland. Preliminary plan indicated that the people who would have worked in these shops would have also lived in the city.

Green belt
Separating the city core from the low-density residential area would be an expanse of grass areas, known to the planners as the "green belt." This is where the city services would be located. Establishments such as parks with playgrounds, community centers, schools, stadiums, and churches would be located here.

Residential areas
On the rim of the city core would have been high-density apartment housing. This is where most of EPCOT's 20,000 citizens would have lived. Not much is discussed about the apartments themselves, although Walt Disney stated that no-one in EPCOT would own their land. There would be no difference between an apartment and a home. All renting rates would be modest and competitive with the surrounding market. Housing would be constructed in such a way as to ensure ease of change, so that new ideas/products could be used. A person returning from a hard day's work could very well come home to a kitchen with brand-new appliances in it.

Beyond the Green Belt was the low-density, single-family house neighborhoods. These areas would have resembled the petals on a flower, with the houses located on the rim of each "petal". Inside the "petal" was a vast green area. The area would have had paths for electric carts, light recreation areas for adults and play areas for children. The PeopleMover station for each area would have also been located in the green area. The resident could simply walk to the station from their home and on to work. As with the apartments, the houses would be built to be easily changed.

Living and employment
As no one living in EPCOT would own their own land or home, residents would have no municipal voting rights (bond issues, etc.). Walt Disney wanted to exercise this control only to be able to change technology in homes easily.

According to the film, all adults living in EPCOT would be employed, thereby preventing the formation of slums and ghettos. There would be no retirees—everyone would have been required to have a job. Residents would have been employed at the Magic Kingdom theme park, the city central core shopping areas, the hotel/convention center, the airport, the Welcome Center, or the industrial park. As the film states, "everyone living in EPCOT will have the responsibility to maintain this living blueprint of the future."

General Electric's Progress City model 

The Carousel of Progress, sponsored by General Electric, was one of four of Walt Disney's pavilions at the 1964-1965 New York World's Fair (known as Progressland there). The show consisted of Audio-Animatronic "actors" presenting the progress of household technology through the decades. The same "family" was used for each time period.  Guests were seated in an outer ring of six theaters that rotated around a fixed, circular stage. The Disneyland version of the Carousel opened in July 1967 and featured a huge, one-eighth scale model called Progress City. It could be viewed on foot or from the PeopleMover attraction in Tomorrowland. The model was constructed after Walt's death but featured the basic elements of the EPCOT plan: city center and hotel, high density apartments, greenbelt, and single family houses.

The model measured 6,900 square feet and included 22,000 trees and shrubs, 4,500 buildings lit from within, 1,400 street lights, a climate-controlled center city, amusement park rides in motion, sports stadiums, an airport, an atomic power plant, underground passageways, single family cul-de-sacs, retail stores, monorails, electric sidewalks, schools, churches, electric trains, electric carts, and PeopleMovers. The city was all-electric. The show's theme song, "There's a Great Big Beautiful Tomorrow," was written by Robert B. Sherman and Richard M. Sherman and reflects Walt's view of progress and American industry.

General Electric and Westinghouse had been in merger discussions with the Disney organization but a deal never came to fruition. EPCOT would be an expensive proposition. In a 1968 print advertisement, General Electric announced that it had "much of the technology needed....  But as futuristic as it sounds, it could be built today." The ad also featured a photograph of Progress City. General Electric was prepared to tackle EPCOT.

Disneyland's Carousel of Progress closed in 1973 and the show was moved to Walt Disney World's Magic Kingdom in 1975. A portion of the Progress City architectural model is on display on the Tomorrowland Transit Authority PeopleMover today, located in Tomorrowland at the Magic Kingdom.

EPCOT after Disney
Walt Disney died on December 15, 1966. According to his older brother Roy O. Disney, Walt was still planning EPCOT in the hospital in the days before he died. Walt used the ceiling grid to lay out a scale plot plan in his imagination, each 24" x 24" tile representing one square mile. Florida Governor Claude R. Kirk Jr. signed Chapter 67-764 into law on May 12, 1967, establishing the Reedy Creek Improvement District. However, Disney directors eventually decided that it was too risky to venture into city planning now that its biggest advocate was gone. Roy persisted and took the reins on the project, coming out of retirement, but he could not convince the board to build EPCOT. The Magic Kingdom project proceeded with construction beginning the same year under the supervision of Roy, and Walt Disney World Resort opened in October 1971 with only the Magic Kingdom and two hotels. Roy insisted it be called Walt Disney World as a tribute to the man who had dreamed it up.

Even though the city was never built, the Resort represents some of the forward-thinking planning that embodied Walt's idea of EPCOT. Because of the formation of the RCID, Disney could find innovative solutions to the problems of transportation, building construction, supplying electrical power, and waste disposal. Imagineers, including John Hench and Richard Irvine, devised means of waste disposal and sewer transport. The monorail, while mainly an attraction at Disneyland, was utilized as an actual transportation system, taking guests some thirteen miles around the Resort area. The Contemporary Resort opened with the Magic Kingdom as an architectural remnant of EPCOT's modernist aesthetic.

Without Walt Disney's personal leadership, EPCOT's progress was "seriously weakened." In the late 1970s, Disney CEO Card Walker wanted to revisit the EPCOT idea, but the board was still wary and all agreed that Walt's EPCOT would not work in its initial incarnation; they thought that no one would want to live under a microscope and be watched constantly. The result of the compromise was the EPCOT Center theme park (now simply known as EPCOT), which opened in 1982. While still emulating Walt Disney's ideas, it was not a city, but rather closer to that of a World's Fair. EPCOT, somewhat true to Walt Disney's vision, revolves around technology and the future in the Future World area. The World Showcase is an embellished version of the downtown shopping area, albeit without the enclosure.

In the early 1990s, the Walt Disney Company built a community on the Florida property called Celebration. It is a planned community that employs some of the ideas that Walt Disney envisioned, but on a significantly smaller scale. Unlike EPCOT, which was based on modernism and futurism, there is no radial design for Celebration. Celebration is designed based on new urbanism, and resembles a small American town, but has all the modern conveniences, without the revolutionary transportation ideas contained in the plans for EPCOT. Similar planned communities, known as lifestyle centers, are now being built by other planners.

Singapore is often cited as a real-life EPCOT country. William Gibson described Singapore as "Disneyland with the death penalty" in an article for Wired in 1993, due to its high degree of city planning and clean and orderly lifestyle, just as Walt Disney would have wanted his community to be.

References

Further reading
 
 Walt Disney and the Promise of Progress City - 2014.  Text written by Sam Gennaway.  Published by Theme Park Press.
 Walt Disney and the Quest for Community - 2017.  Text written by Steve Mannheim.  Published by Routledge.  .
 Florida Film - 1966. Film. Script written by Walt Disney with Martin A. Sklar. Available on the "Tomorrowland" volume of the Walt Disney Treasures DVD series.
 Walt Disney's EPCOT Center - 1982. Text written by Richard R. Beard. Published by Harry N. Abrams, Inc. 
 Walt: The Man Behind the Myth - 2001. Film. Written by Katherine and Richard Greene.
 Since the World Began - 1996. Book written by Jeff Kurtti. Published by Hyperion.

External links
 Walt Disney's original EPCOT project
 Walt Disney Family Museum

Unbuilt Disney attractions
Proposed populated places in the United States
Planned communities in Florida
Walt Disney
Walt Disney World

fr:EPCOT